was a noble and general during Japan's Heian period. He was the son of Fujiwara Mimbu-no-kyo Tokinaga who in turn was grandson of Fujiwara no Uona (771 - 778) founding father of the Northern Fujiwara.

He held the title of Chinjufu-shōgun, or Commander-in-chief of the Defense of the North. He was also father of Fujiwara Kaga-no-suke Tadayori and grandfather of Fujiwara no Yoshimune.

References
 Shokyuki. An Account of the Shokyu War of 1221, by William H. McCullough Monumenta Nipponica © 1964 Sophia University

Fujiwara clan
Year of death unknown
Year of birth unknown